Freiburg Minster is the cathedral of Freiburg im Breisgau, southwest Germany. The last duke of Zähringen had started the building around 1200 in romanesque style. The construction continued in 1230 in Gothic style. The minster was partly built on the foundations of an original church that had been there from the beginning of Freiburg, in 1120. 

In the Middle Ages, Freiburg lay in the Diocese of Konstanz. In 1827, Freiburg Minster became the seat of the newly erected Catholic Archdiocese of Freiburg, and thus a cathedral.

Architecture

The Swiss historian Jacob Burckhardt once said that the church's 116-meter tower will forever remain the most beautiful spire on earth. His remark gave rise to the frequently heard misquote of the most beautiful tower in the whole of Christianity. 

The tower is nearly square at the base, and at its centre is the dodecagonal star gallery. Above this gallery, the tower is octagonal and tapered, and above this, is the spire.

It is the only Gothic church tower in Germany that was completed in the Middle Ages (1330), and has lasted until the present, surviving the bombing raids of November 1944, which destroyed all of the houses on the west and north side of the market. The tower was subject to severe vibration at the time, and its survival of these vibrations is attributed to its lead anchors, which connect the sections of the spire. The windows had been taken out of the spire at the time by church staff led by Monsignor Max Fauler, and so these also suffered no damage.

Freiburg Minster was not the seat of a bishop until 1827, long after it was built.

The tower has 16 bells, the oldest being the "Hosanna" bell from 1258, which weighs 3,290 kilograms. This bell can be heard on Thursday evening after the Angelus, on Friday at 11:00 am (a time consequently known as "Spätzleglocke"), on Saturday evenings, and each year on 27 November in remembrance of the air raid.

Interior

There are two important altars inside the cathedral: the high altar of Hans Baldung, and another altar of Hans Holbein the Younger in a side chapel.

The inner portal contains sculptures of the Ten Virgins.

The nave windows were donated by the guilds, and the symbols of the guilds are featured on them. The deep red color in some of the windows is not the result of a dye, but instead the result of a suspension of solid gold nanoparticles.

In 2003, the Lenten cloth was restored and backed with a supporting material. It now weighs over a ton, and so must be carried from the workshop with heavy machinery for its use during Lent.

Bells
The cathedral holds 19 bells, altogether 25 tonnes, making it one of the largest peals in Germany.

Burials
Berthold V, Duke of Zähringen
The Locherer family (altarpiece by Hans Sixt)

Legal situation
From the time of its construction, the cathedral was not owned by the Roman Catholic Church but by the people of Freiburg. In the Middle Ages, the situation changed so that the building was self-owned, and administered by a guardian appointed by the people of the city. More recently, the Münsterbauverein association was created, which now legally owns the cathedral.

Conservation

For the conservation of the cathedral, the Freiburger Münsterbauverein ("Freiburg Minster-Upkeep Association") was established. The association invests several million euros each year in the care and maintenance of the building and its interior. The present architect in charge is Yvonne Faller and the chair of the association is Sven von Ungern-Sternberg.

Gallery

See also
The Ten Virgins
List of tallest structures built before the 20th century

External links
This article is based on a translation of the German Wikipedia article Freiburger Münster''.

 Cathedral windows

References

Roman Catholic cathedrals in Baden-Württemberg
Minster
Gothic architecture in Germany
Tourist attractions in Freiburg im Breisgau
Burial sites of the House of Zähringen